Alibi Ike is a 1935 American romantic comedy film directed by Ray Enright and starring Joe E. Brown, Olivia de Havilland and William Frawley. Based on the short story of the same name by Ring Lardner, first published in the Saturday Evening Post on July 31, 1915, the film is about an ace baseball player nicknamed "Alibi Ike" for his penchant for making up excuses. Lardner is said to have patterned the character after baseball player King Cole.

Alibi Ike was the most successful of Joe E. Brown's "baseball trilogy" of films, which also included Elmer, the Great and Fireman, Save My Child. It is considered one of the best baseball comedies of all time. Alibi Ike was the first feature film released starring Olivia de Havilland, although she made two previous films that were released later that year—The Irish in Us and the all-star Shakespeare epic A Midsummer Night's Dream, which also starred Joe E. Brown in a key role.

A print of the film is held by the Library of Congress.

Plot

Frank X. Farrell (Joe E. Brown) is an ace baseball player whose insistence on making excuses earns him the nickname "Alibi Ike." In the course of his first season with the Chicago Cubs, Farrell falls in love with Dolly Stevens (Olivia de Havilland), sister-in-law of the team's manager. Farrell's "alibi" habit prompts Dolly to walk out on him, after which he goes into a slump—which coincides with attempts by gamblers to get Farrell to throw the World Series.

Cast
 Joe E. Brown as Frank X. Farrell
 Olivia de Havilland as Dolly Stevens
 William Frawley as Cap
 Ruth Donnelly as Bess
 Roscoe Karns as Carey
 Eddie Shubert as Jack Mack
 Paul Harvey as Lefty Crawford
 Joe King as Johnson, the owner
 G. Pat Collins as Lieutenant
 Spencer Charters as Minister
 Gene Morgan as Smitty

Cast notes:

Several popular Major League Baseball players make cameo appearances in the film, including Guy Cantrell, Dick Cox, Cedric Durst, Mike Gazella, Wally Hood, Don Hurst, Smead Jolley, Lou Koupal, Bob Meusel, Wally Rehg, and Jim Thorpe.

References

External links

 
 
 
 
 "Alibi Ike" by Ring Lardner 

1935 films
1935 romantic comedy films
1930s sports comedy films
American baseball films
American romantic comedy films
American sports comedy films
American black-and-white films
1930s English-language films
Films based on short fiction
Films directed by Ray Enright
Short stories by Ring Lardner
Warner Bros. films
1930s American films